Strasbourg Illkirch-Graffenstaden Basket, most commonly known as SIG Basket or SIG Strasbourg, is a French professional basketball club that is based in Strasbourg. The club, founded in 1929, competes domestically in the French Pro A League, and internationally in the Basketball Champions League. The club's home games are played at Rhénus Sport. The players wear white and red uniforms.

History

The club was founded in 1929, and reached the top-tier of French basketball for the first time in 1938.

Starting from the 2004–05 season, new head coach Éric Girard took over the team. In the regular season, SIG finished 3rd and Giard was named Coach of the Year. Strasbourg won the top-tier French League for the first time in the 2004–05 season. SIG beat its rival SLUC Nancy 72–68.

In the 2005–06 season, Strasbourg played in the EuroLeague. The team had some outstanding results, as they beat top-tier team Saski Baskonia. In the Pro A, the team was defeated by Nancy 1–2 in the Semi-finals.

In the 2006–07 season, the team wouldn't reach further than the Quarter-finals. After some down years, the team started to revive when Vincent Collet took over as head coach in 2012. The team reached the Pro A Finals for three straight years in 2013, 2014, 2015. Along with that, the team won the 2015 Leaders Cup and 2014–15 French Basketball Cup. Important players for the team were Antoine Diot and Louis Campbell, who won MVP Awards in the won competitions.

In 2020, Vincent Collet left the team after he had served as head coach for almost a decade. For the 2020–21 Pro A season, the team started a recommencement as new head coach Lassi Tuovi recruited almost entirely new players. Strasbourg aims to regain success in both the national league as well as in the 2020–21 Basketball Champions League.

Arenas
The 6,200 seat Rhénus Sport has been used as the home arena of SIG for many years. In January 2017, the club announced their building plans for a new arena that is to be finished in 2020, that will accommodate 10,000 people. Later, the date was corrected to the year 2024.

Rivalries

The Eastern Rivalry
The Eastern Derby is the name of the matches that are played between Strasbourg IG and SLUC Nancy. The rivalry has a strong emotional history.

Budgets
According to Ligue Nationale de Basket (LNB) guidelines, SIG has to publish its budget for each season.

Players

Current roster

Depth chart

Season by season

Honours
French League
 Winners (1): 2004–05
French Cup
 Winners (2): 2014–15, 2017–18
 Runners-up (2): 1998–99, 2021–22
Leaders Cup 
 Winners (2): 2015, 2019
 Runners-up (1): 2013
Match des Champions
Winners (1): 2015
French Second Division
 Winners (1): 1998–99
Brussels, Belgium Invitational Game
 Winners (1): 2015
Luxeuil-les-Bains, France Invitational Game
 Winners (1): 2015
Besançon, France Invitational Game
 Winners (1): 2015

Notable players

Head coaches

References

External links
 Official website
 Strasbourg IG at Eurobasket.com

 
Basketball teams established in 1929
Strasbourg
Sport in Strasbourg
1929 establishments in France